Kip Hanrahan (born December 9, 1954) is an American jazz music impresario, record producer and percussionist.

Personal life
Hanrahan was born in a Puerto Rican neighborhood in the Bronx to an Irish-Jewish family.  His father left when he was 6 months old, leaving his mother and grandfather to raise him.   He has described his grandfather as "this cynical Russian communist" whose approval of rebellion against authority he cites as among his early musical influences.

While attending Cooper Union on a scholarship, he studied with visual-conceptual artist Hans Haacke.  He has cited Haacke as his strongest influence.  As part of his university study, he traveled to North Africa, and lived in India for a year.

In his work as a composer, bandleader, and producer, he has compared his role to that of a film director, saying "Making a record is like making a film. If anything, the analogy holds too true. The recording engineer becomes the cinematographer; I work with the musicians as I would with actors: You sing the lines the way they should be phrased; you shoot scenes and the scenes are not in sequential order, and every scene has a different light and sound."

Career
He has an unusual role in the albums released under his name, one which he has analogized to that of a film director. He assembles players and materials, combining modern/avant-garde/free jazz figures like David Murray, Don Pullen and Steve Swallow, Latin jazz players such as Milton Cardona and Horacio "El Negro" Hernandez, and occasionally rock musicians like Sting, Grayson Hugh, Fernando Saunders, and Jack Bruce.

He produced a number of significant recordings by the nuevo tango master Astor Piazzolla in the last decade of Piazzolla's life, as well as recordings by Latin music figures including Jerry Gonzalez. Hanrahan also worked with the poet Ishmael Reed on three recordings with the Conjure Ensemble, featuring Taj Mahal on the first release. The Conjure projects were not the only poetry-based albums. Darn It, a double-CD released in 1993, gathered music to the poems of Paul Haines, Hanrahan had compiled over the past seven years since 1986, with contributions by a wideranging group of sessions like Derek Bailey singing, duos by Evan Parker with Robert Wyatt and Carmen Lundy, Alex Chilton with a piano trio around Wayne Horvitz, Mary Margaret O'Hara with Gary Lucas and Steve Swallow, and John Oswald playing alto saxophone alongside fellow Canadian and multimedia artist Michael Snow, who also provided the cover and booklet design. Yet another literary project, spanning over several years, was A Thousand Nights and a Night about the legendary Arabic tale teller Scheherazade, the second album of which was titled record of the year by French Jazzman magazine in 1998 and gained five stars in a Downbeat review.

Discography
All albums were released on Hanrahan's American Clavé label.

 Coup de Tête (1981)
 Desire Develops an Edge (1983)
 Vertical's Currency (1985)
 A Few Short Notes for the End Run (EP, 1986)
 Days and Nights of Blue Luck Inverted (1987)
 Tenderness (1990)
 Exotica (1993)
 Paul Haines – Darn It! (1993)
 All Roads Are Made of the Flesh (live and studio recordings, 1995)
 A Thousand Nights and a Night (1 - Red Nights) (1996)
 A Thousand Nights and a Night (Shadow Nights 1) (1998)
 A Thousand Nights and a Night (Shadow Nights 2) (1999)
 Drawn from Memory (Greatest Hits or Whatever) (Compilation, 2001)
 Original Music from the Soundtrack to Piñero (2002)
 Beautiful Scars (2007)
 At Home in Anger (2011)
 Crescent Moon Waning (2017)

With Conjure
 Conjure: Music for the Texts of Ishmael Reed (1985)
 Cab Calloway Stands in for the Moon (1988)
 Bad Mouth (2006)

References

External links
 "American Clavé" - Kip Hanrahan's record label
 "Kip Hanrahan non official site" - French Fan Web Site in English
 BBC review of Beautiful Scars, 2007

Living people
1954 births
People from the Bronx
American jazz musicians
American people of Irish descent
Record producers from New York (state)
Jewish American musicians
Jewish jazz musicians
Jazz musicians from New York (state)
21st-century American Jews